Klaus Ottmann (born 1954 in Nuremberg, West Germany) is a writer, art curator and publisher. He is currently Deputy Director for Academic Affairs and Special Projects at The Phillips Collection in Washington, D.C.

Education
Ottmann received a M.A. in philosophy from the Freie Universität Berlin, Germany, and a Ph.D. in philosophy from the Division of Media and Communications at the European Graduate School in Saas-Fee, Switzerland.

Career
At The Phillips Collection, he has organized the exhibitions Karel Appel: A Gesture of Color; Hiroshi Sugimoto: Conceptual Forms and Mathematical Models; Angels, Demons, and Savages: Pollock, Ossorio, Dubuffet; and Per Kirkeby: Paintings and Sculpture; and oversaw the installation of the Phillips’s new permanent installation, a Wax Room created by Wolfgang Laib.  Ottmann has curated more than 50 international exhibitions, including Jennifer Bartlett: History of the Universe. Works 1970–2011; Still Points of the Turning World: SITE Santa Fe’s Sixth International Biennial; Life, Love, and Death: The Work of James Lee Byars; Wolfgang Laib: A Retrospective; and Strange Attractors: The Spectacle of Chaos. His publications include Yves Klein by Himself: His Life and Thought, The Genius Decision: The Extraordinary and the Postmodern Condition, and The Essential Mark Rothko. In 2006, he translated and edited Yves Klein's complete writings, Overcoming the Problematics of Art: The Writings of Yves Klein, and in 2010 he translated F.W.J. Schelling’s Philosophy and Religion (1804).

Ottmann is the publisher and editor of Spring Publications, which publishes books on archetypal psychology, symbolic imagination, art and the philosophy of art, phenomenology, the philosophy of psychology, religion, mysticism, and gnosis.

Awards
In 2016, Ottmann was awarded the Medal of Chevalier of the Order of Arts and Letters. Created in 1957, the Order of Arts and Letters (Ordre des Arts et des Lettres) honors notable artists and writers, as well as others who have significantly contributed to furthering the arts in France and around the world.

Books
 Wolfgang Laib: A Retrospective, 
 The Essential Mark Rothko, 
 James Lee Byars: Life, Love, and Death, 
 The Genius Decision: The Extraordinary and the Postmodern Condition, 
 Thought Through My Eyes: Writings on Art, 1977–2005, 
 Overcoming the Problematics of Art: The Writings of Yves Klein,  (translator)

References

External links
Official site

American art curators
German curators
German art curators
Living people
1954 births